Gonguembo, also NGonguembo, is a town and municipality in Cuanza Norte Province in Angola. The population is 7,576 as of 2014 in an area of 1,400 km. The municipality consists of the communes Camame, Cavunga and NGonguembo (Quilombo dos Dembos).

References

Populated places in Cuanza Norte Province
Municipalities of Angola